Louis Nicolas Matout (19 March 1811, in Renwez – 24 January 1888, in Paris) was a French painter and muralist. He was known primarily for cityscapes with figures and genre scenes.

Biography 
He was from a family of modest means but, thanks to the generosity of an architect he met at a construction site where he was employed, he was able to gain admission to the École nationale supérieure des beaux-arts in Paris.

His first exhibit at the Salon came in 1833 and he would continue to have showings there until 1879. The two adjoining frescoes were replaced with tableaux of Lanfranc and Pierre-Joseph Desault. These and the remaining frescoes by Gibelin were destroyed by a fire in 1889.

The publicity engendered by this project led to several other public works, notably at St-Gervais-et-St-Protais, the Church of Saint-Merri and the Church of Saint-Sulpice. Later, he worked at the Cathedral of St Philippe in Algiers (now the Ketchaoua Mosque), La Rochelle Cathedral and Angoulême Cathedral. He had a major showing at the Exposition Universelle (1867). He was named a Chevalier in the Legion of Honor in 1857.

His works may be seen at the Louvre, the Musée Fesch and at numerous small museums throughout France.

Selected paintings

References

Further reading 
 Pierre Larousse, Grand dictionnaire universel du XIXe siècle (1877), vol.17, pg. 1574 Online.
 Maxime Du Camp, Les beaux-arts à l'exposition universelle et aux salons de 1863, 1864, 1865, 1866 et 1867, Veuve Jules Renouard, pgs.=27, 28, 56, 351 Online

External links

Biography and works @ the Famille Matout website
 Dictionnaire Bénézit. "Matout, Louis (1811-1888), Painter", Oxford Index

1811 births
1888 deaths
19th-century French painters
French muralists
People from Ardennes (department)
Cityscape artists